Columbellopsis is a genus of sea snails, marine gastropod mollusks in the family Columbellidae, the dove snails.

Species
Species within the genus Columbellopsis include:

 Columbellopsis nycteis (Duclos, 1846)

References

Columbellidae
Monotypic gastropod genera